www.tism.wanker.com is the fourth studio album by Australian alternative rock group TISM (This Is Serious Mum), released in June 1998. The album peaked at number 26 on the ARIA charts.

At the ARIA Music Awards of 1998, the album was nominated for the ARIA Award for Best Independent Release.

The title references an internet URL which, at the time of release, was a subdomain (of wanker.com) provided by a friendly person overseas who had registered wanker.com, as TISM were not able to obtain their preferred domain, wanker.com.au, due to Australian domain regulations. However, the web hosting fees were not paid, subsequently it was taken down by the hosting ISP several months after launch and has not been available since.

Early editions of the CD featured a CD-ROM component. The program asks the user whether they want to continue – repeatedly. Eventually, it responds "OK then. Downloading virus." No virus is actually downloaded.

On 12 October 2022, the album was announced for a November reissue on CD and blue vinyl, with the CD containing five of the six actual songs from the original 1998 bonus CD, Att: Shock Records Faulty Pressing Do Not Manufacture (the rest of the tracks were poems and recordings of the band talking amongst each other), plus "Drop the Tude", a B-side to the "I Might Be a Cunt, but I'm Not a Fucking Cunt" single. A deluxe vinyl box set was also announced for mid-2023.

Singles
 "Yob" was released in November 1997 as the album's lead single. This song details the "ingredients" which go into making up a "yobbo".
"I Might Be a Cunt, but I'm Not a Fucking Cunt" was released in April 1998 as the album's second single. The song peaked at number 90 on the ARIA charts. The song and its accompanying music video of a couple having sex was banned by the SBS, ABC's rage, and Triple J due to its content; however, it was played quite frequently by Melbourne independent broadcaster 3RRR on the Breakfasters show. Bruce Ruxton, the head of the Victorian Branch of the Australian RSL, wrote a letter of complaint to Shock Records asking for TISM to be fired from the label, and describing the song as "...Dropping [Australia's standards] through the floor into the proverbial sewer". Ron Hitler Barassi of TISM responded to criticism in an interview saying "I actually like the song, the thing that disappoints me about some of the reaction to the song is people's reaction was confined to 'oh how naughty, oh those naughty boys TISM have said a naughty word, fuck, and another naughty word, cunt, and oh that's so naughty' and I must admit, I was sort of, and I shouldn't have, I was disappointed with that reaction ... We were attempting to use the common dialect of people in the street, to sum up a term, have a good pisstake. It's more than just naughtiness. That's very profound isn't it?"
"Whatareya?" was released in July 1998 as the album's third single. The song peaked at number 66 on the ARIA charts.
"Thunderbirds Are Coming Out" was released in October 1998 as the fourth and final single from the album.

Reception

Jonathan Lewis from AllMusic said "www.tism.wanker.com was a misbegotten attempt to recreate the success of its predecessor, but it fails on most counts. Machiavelli was a funny album: tasteless, yet tongue-in-cheek enough to charm listeners. www.tism.wanker.com, however, was simply offensive. The humour was forced, the lyrics less clever than on previous outings and the music was becoming stale." Lewis said "Highlights were few and far between, although 'Thunderbirds Are Coming Out' was a standout."

Track listings

Att: Shock Records Faulty Pressing Do Not Manufacture
Initial pressings of the album were shipped with a bonus disc. The CD in question looks like a blank CDR, with texta writing that reads "Att: SHOCK RECORDS FAULTY PRESSING DO NOT MANUFACTURE"; thinking it was serious, some retail chains actually returned boxes of the "fake" CDs unopened. In reality, it featured six outtakes from the wanker.com sessions and several poems, bookended by low-quality audio recordings of Hitler-Barassi and Flaubert discussing various topics whilst watching a pornographic film.

The "conversation" tracks have never been given an official title. For the iTunes re-release, these tracks were appended to the start/end of the titled tracks. The titles were available on TISM's website at the time.

"The Last Australian Guitar Hero", "Kate - Fischer of Men" and "I'd Be Happier if I Wasn't More Depressed" were released as B-sides to singles.

Charts

Release history

References

1997 albums
TISM albums